This is a list of Japanese football J1 League transfers in the winter transfer window 2019–20 by club.

J1 League

Yokohama F. Marinos

In:

Out:

FC Tokyo

In:

Out:

Kashima Antlers

In:

Out:

Kawasaki Frontale

In:

Out:

Cerezo Osaka

In:

Out:

Sanfrecce Hiroshima

In:

Out:

Gamba Osaka

In:

Out:

Vissel Kobe

In:

Out:

Oita Trinita

In:

Out:

Hokkaido Consadole Sapporo

In:

Out:

Vegalta Sendai

In:

Out:

Shimizu S-Pulse

In:

Out:

Nagoya Grampus

In:

Out:

Urawa Red Diamonds

In:

Out:

Sagan Tosu

In:

Out:

Shonan Bellmare

In:

Out:

Kashiwa Reysol

In:

Out:

Yokohama FC

In:

Out:

References

2019-20
Transfers
Japan